Acacia betchei, commonly known as red-tip wattle, is a shrub belonging to the genus Acacia and the subgenus Phyllodineae endemic to eastern Australia.

Description
The thin green straight to incurved phyllodes have a narrowly linear shape.

Taxonomy
The species was first formally described by the botanists Joseph Maiden and William Blakely in 1927 as published in the Journal and Proceedings of the Royal Society of New South Wales. It was reclassified as Racosperma betchei in 1987 by Leslie Pedley then transferred back to the genus Acacia in 2001. It is often confused with Acacia adunca.

Distribution
It is found along the tablelands of the Great Dividing Range from north-eastern New South Wales from around Torrington in the south extending to south eastern Queensland to around Dalveen in the north. It is found in sandy granite based soils as a part of forest communities.

See also
 List of Acacia species

References

betchei
Flora of New South Wales
Flora of Queensland
Plants described in 1927
Taxa named by Joseph Maiden
Taxa named by William Blakely